Barry Edward Dempster (born 17 January 1952) is a Canadian poet, novelist, and editor.

Barry Dempster was born in Toronto, Ontario, and educated in child psychology. He is the author of two novels, a children's book, three volumes of short stories, and sixteen collections of poetry. Dempster's prose was first noticed by renowned Canadian editor and writer, John Metcalf, for his anthology Third Impressions (Oberon Press) in which Metcalf showcased three promising young authors. A contract from Oberon Press soon followed for the publication of two collections of highly praised short stories. Quarry Press came forward with an offer to publish his first novel, The Ascension of Jesse Rapture, which also received excellent reviews.

Dempster has twice been nominated for the Governor General's Award for literature—for his first book, Fables for Isolated Men (Guernica, 1982), and for The Burning Alphabet (Brick Books, 2005), which also won the Canadian Authors Association Jack Chalmers Award for poetry. In 2010 and 2015 he was a finalist for the Ontario Premier's Award of Excellence in the Arts. In 2013, Dempster was a finalist for his second novel, The Outside World, (Pedlar Press, 2013) for Ontario's Trillium Award.

From 1990 to 1997, he was poetry and reviews editor for Poetry Canada, which quickly became one of Canada's most esteemed literary magazines. For over 10 years, he was the mainstay of the publication in the role of reviews editor and then poetry and reviews editor, as it changed ownership and staff. During this time, Dempster became known for his helpful, supportive letters to submitting writers, his astute book reviews and his "New Voice" discoveries of some of Canada's finest poets.

From 1999 to 2018, he was senior acquisitions editor with Brick Books, where he discovered and edited many of Canada's finest emerging and established poets. His editorial successes include a Griffin Prize winner and a Griffin nominee; he has also edited a Governor General's Award winning collection as well as a collection that won the 2005 Trillium Award.

Equally comfortable working in prose and poetry, Dempster also has extensive experience as a creative writing instructor. He has been on the faculty at The Banff Centre as mentor for the Writing Studio, Wired Writing and Writing with Styles programs, and has twice been the writer-in-residence at the Richmond Hill Public Library. He has run hundreds of workshops in Ontario elementary and high schools, as well as teaching at the Upper Canada Writers' Workshop in Kingston, Ontario and Sage Hill, Saskatchewan. He has also offered master classes in Santiago, Chile; Victoria, British Columbia; Mahone Bay and Shelbourne, Nova Scotia; Winnipeg, Manitoba; and in Ottawa, Hamilton, Barrie, Holland Landing and Newmarket in Ontario.

Tread & Other Stories was shortlisted for the 2019 ReLit Award for short fiction.

Dempster was living in York Region with his wife where he ran a very popular film series "Southlake Cinemania," which raised funds to support literacy through the arts. He and his wife are now currently living in Grey Bruce. His website is www.barrydempsterauthor.com.

Bibliography
Poetry
 Fables For Isolated Men – (poetry) Guernica, 1982 (nominated for a Governor General's Award)
Globe Doubts – 1983
Positions to Pray In – 1989
The Unavoidable Man – 1990
The Ascension of Jesse Rapture – 1993
Fire and Brimstone – 1997
The Salvation of Desire – 2000
The Words Wanting Out: Selected and New Poems – 2003
The Burning Alphabet – 2005 (winner of the 2006 Canadian Authors Association Jack Chalmers Poetry Award and nominated for a Governor General's Award)
Love Outlandish – (poetry), Brick Books,2009 
Ivan's Birches – (poetry) Pedlar Press, 2009
Blue Wherever – 2010
 Dying a Little (poetry), Wolsak and Wynn 2011 
 Invisible Dogs (poetry), Brick Books, London, Ontario 2013 
 Disturbing the Buddha (poetry) Brick Books, London, Ontario 2016
 Being Here, the chemistry of startle (poetry), Frontenac House Poetry, Alberta 2022

Fiction
 Real Places and Imaginary Men (short stories, 174 pages). Oberon Press, Ottawa 
 1984 Writing Home (short stories, 191 pages). Oberon Press, Ottawa 
 1989 The Ascension of Jesse Rapture (novel, 258 pages). Quarry Press, Kingston 1993
 The Outside World (novel) Pedlar Press, December 2013 
.Tread and Other Stories 2018
Children's * David and the Daydreams (children's fiction, 143 pages). Guernica Editions, Montreal 1985

Anthologies 
 Tributaries: Writer to Writer (poetry).Mosaic Press, Oakville 
 1980: Best Canadian Stories (short stories). Oberon Press, 1980 
 Third Impressions (short stories). Oberon Press 1982
 Canadian Poetry Now:20 Poets of the 80s (poetry).Anansi, 1984
 And Other Travels (poetry).Moonstone Press, 1988
 Christian Poetry in Canada (poetry).ECW Press, 1989
 More Garden Varieties Two (poetry).The Mercury Press, 1990
 The Oberon Reader (short stories). HarperCollins, 1991
 Vintage 95 (poetry).Quarry Press, 1996
 We All Begin in a Little Magazine, Arc and the Promise of Canada's Poets 1978–1998 (poetry).Carleton/Arc, 
 1998 A Matter of Spirit, Recovery of the Sacred in Contemporary Canadian Poetry (poetry).Ekstasis Editions, 1998
 Literatura na swiecie Canada (poetry). Poland 
 I Want to Be the Poet of Your Kneecaps, Poems of Quirky Romance(poetry).Black Moss Press, 1999
 New Life in Dark Seas:Brick Books 25 (poetry).Brick Books, 2000
 Henry's Creature, Poems and Stories on the automobile (poetry).Black Moss Press, 2000
 Why I Sing the Blues, Lyrics and Poems (poetry).Smoking Lung Press, 2001
 Smaller Than God, Words of Spiritual Longing (poetry).Black Moss Press, 2001
 Best Canadian Poetry in English (poetry). Tightrope Books, 2008
 How the Light Gets In...Anthology of Poetry from Canada (poetry). University College, Dublin, 2009
 Best Canadian Poetry in English (poetry), Tightrope Books, 2009
 A Verdant Green (poetry), The Battered Silicon Dispatch Box, 2010
 Best Canadian Poetry in English (poetry) (fall 2010), Tightrope Books, 2010
 Best Canadian Poetry in English (poetry)(fall 2011), Tightrope Books, 2011
Awards
 Governor General's Award for Poetry, Shortlist, 1982
 League of Canadian Poets National Poetry Contest, Honorable Mention, 1990
 Confederation Poets Prize, Honorable Mention, 1994
 Confederation Poets Prize, Winner, 1995
 League of Canadian Poets National Poetry Contest, Honorable Mention, 1995
 Scarborough Bi-Centennial Award of Merit, 1996
 Canadian Literary Awards, Finalist, 2002
 The National Magazine Awards, Shortlist, 2002
 Petra Kenney Poetry Competition, England, 2nd Prize, 2002
 Governor General's Award for Poetry, Shortlist, 2005
 Canadian Authors Association Jack Chalmers Award for Poetry, 2006
 Prairie Fire Poetry Contest, 3rd Prize, 2009
 Ontario Premiere's Award for Excellence in the Arts finalist, 2010
 Trillium Book Award finalist, for novel "The Outside World", 2014
 Ontario Premiere's Award for Excellence second time finalist, 2015

References

1952 births
Living people
20th-century Canadian poets
20th-century Canadian male writers
Canadian male poets
21st-century Canadian poets
20th-century Canadian novelists
21st-century Canadian novelists
Canadian male novelists
Canadian male short story writers
Canadian book editors
Canadian magazine editors
Canadian anthologists
Writers from Toronto
20th-century Canadian short story writers
21st-century Canadian short story writers
21st-century Canadian male writers